Asgeir Kåre Almås (born June 15, 1948) is a Norwegian politician for the Norwegian Labour Party and mayor of Hattfjelldal.

In 2007 he was one of the eight mayors that led the municipalities in their accusations against Terra-Gruppen in the Terra Securities scandal, where Hattfjelldal risked losing NOK 103 million.,

References

Labour Party (Norway) politicians
Mayors of places in Nordland
Living people
1948 births
Place of birth missing (living people)